Erēmīta (Anthologies) is an arthouse documentary anthology featuring short films composed during the 2020 COVID-19 pandemic. The anthology curated by Sam Abbas interweaves the literature of Friedrich Nietzsche.

Background 
In July 2020, it was announced via Variety a group of film-makers would create an anthology of short documentary films. The anthology shot during the COVID-19 pandemic lockdown features contributions from Alexis Zabé, Ashley Connor, Soledad Rodríguez, Stefano Falivene, Antoine Héberlé, and Abbas.

“There is no theme. Film whatever you want, however you want, with whomever you want.” This is the message that Egyptian filmmaker Sam Abbas sent to his favorite cinematographers as an invitation to contribute to his new film. The film is one of the first projects of Maxxie, Suzzee, & Cinema (a production company in France)

Directors
 Alexis Zabé
 Ashley Connor
 Antoine Héberlé
 Sam Abbas
 Soledad Rodríguez
 Stefano Falivene

Release
A limited release across the United States and internationally February 26, 2021 in physical and virtual cinemas. The filmmakers also announced that 100% of the filmmakers’ share of revenue from rentals will be donated to Amnesty International. The Guardian, first of the reviews gave the film a poor rating claiming the film, "would possibly work better on the walls of a gallery."

References

External links
 
 Profile on Mubi (streaming service)
 

2021 films
Anthology film series
American documentary films
French documentary films
Films about the COVID-19 pandemic
2020s American films
2020s French films